Aghaj Ughli (also Romanized as Āghāj Ūghlī and Āghāj Owghlū; also known as Agadzhagly, Aghajaglil, Āghāj Oghlū, Āghāj Owghlī, Āghāj Ūqlī, and Āqājolī) is a village in Esperan Rural District, in the Central District of Tabriz County, East Azerbaijan Province, Iran. At the 2006 census, its population was 238, in 62 families.

References 

Populated places in Tabriz County